The 2006 Generac 500 was the seventh race for the 2006 American Le Mans Series season at Road America.  It took place on August 20, 2006.

Official results

Class winners in bold.  Cars failing to complete 70% of winner's distance marked as Not Classified (NC).

Statistics
 Post Position - #2 Audi Sport North America - 1:49.181
 Fastest Lap - #20 Dyson Racing - 1:51.586
 Distance - 
 Average Speed -

External links
 

Road America
Road America 500
Road America 500
Road America 500